The 1971 U.S. Figure Skating Championships was held in Buffalo, New York on January 27–31. The compulsory figure competitions were held at Dann Memorial Rink, while the free skating events were held at the Memorial Auditorium. Medals were awarded in three colors: gold (first), silver (second), and bronze (third) in four disciplines – men's singles, ladies' singles, pair skating, and ice dancing – across three levels: senior, junior, and novice.

The event determined the U.S. team for the 1971 World Championships.

In addition to Kenneth Shelley, this event was notable for the number of other skaters competing successfully in multiple disciplines. As well as placing second in senior pairs, Melissa Militano won the junior ladies' title, landing a rare triple toe loop as she had at the previous year's championships. Besides winning a bronze medal in ice dance with Mary Karen Campbell, Johnny Johns competed in senior pairs with another partner, and placed a very respectable 6th in the senior men's division. Sheri Thrapp competed in both senior ladies and senior pairs. Another unusual crossover was the junior pair team of Sheryl Trueman and Jack Courtney who had been World Champions in artistic roller skating in 1969—as a team in pair skating, and Courtney individually in men's single skating. This was their first season of competition on the ice.

Senior results

Men
The men's title was vacant due to the retirement of 1970 champion Tim Wood. The title was won by John Misha Petkevich, while Ken Shelley (pulling double duty by competing in singles as well as pairs) took the silver and young Gordon McKellen placed third.

Ladies
The ladies' competition featured the usual match of this era between Janet Lynn and Julie Lynn Holmes. Holmes had a small lead after the compulsory figures but Lynn pulled ahead in the free skating, in spite of missing an attempt at a triple toe loop. Holmes included an unusual inside double Axel in her free skating.

Pairs
Defending champions JoJo Starbuck / Kenneth Shelley retained their title with a unanimous decision. Their program included new elements which were considered especially daring for the time—a double twist lift and an overhead lift with three positions. The young team of Melissa / Mark Militano finished second, and third place went to Barbara Brown / Doug Berndt in spite of a frightening fall.

Ice dancing (Gold dance)
Judy Schwomeyer / James Sladky dominated the dance event to win their third consecutive national title.

Junior results

Men

Ladies

Pairs

Ice dancing (Silver dance)

* Eliminated before final round

Novice results

Men

Ladies

References

Sources
 "Nationals", Skating magazine, April 1971

U.S. Figure Skating Championships
United States Figure Skating Championships, 1971
United States Figure Skating Championships, 1971
US Figure Skating Championships
US Figure Skating Championships